Season of the Witch: Enchantment, Terror, and Deliverance in the City of Love is a history book by best-selling author David Talbot. The book captures the dark history of San Francisco from the 1960s to the early 1980s utilizing a “kaleidoscopic narrative”  and tells the story of how "the 1967 Summer of Love gave way to 20 or so winters of discontent."

Contexts
Season of the Witch is broken down into three sections, each one depicting a different period within the city; each section is home to a number of chapters that are cleverly titled and a hodge-podge of clever puns to the utmost bizarre.

Enchantment
The story starts off with what San Francisco is best known for within its history:  hippie kids and their drugs that lead to the birthplace of many social movements and the rise of the Counter Culture.

Terror
This is part of San Francisco  history that many would like to forget. Hells Angels running amok at the Rolling Stones concert at Altamont, but saving one of the few free clinics.  The Zodiac and Zebra killers. And the hate-fueled political killing of George Moscone and Harvey Milk.

Deliverance
The book concludes with the riots that followed and the AIDS epidemic that was just heating up.

Appendix: The Best Songs Recorded by San Francisco Bands, 1965-1985

Since San Francisco is known for its music and  music played a large part in its history, Talbot concludes the book with what he considers to be the best and most influential songs recorded during 1965–1985. Songs by San Francisco natives like The Grateful Dead and Jefferson Airplane are included in this list.

One City One Book
The San Francisco Public Library selected Season of the Witch as their One City One Book 2015 selection. An annual literacy event that, through a series of readings and discussions, aims to get the entire city reading and talking about one book with the overall goal of "building bridges between communities and generations" and making "reading a lifelong pursuit" in order to create a more literate society.

Published
Season of the Witch was published by Free Press (NYC) on May 8, 2012.

Reviews
Season of the Witch received starred reviews in Publishers Weekly and Kirkus Reviews, and was hailed as "enthralling, news-driven history" (San Francisco Chronicle), "energetic, highly entertaining storytelling" (Boston Globe), and "an enthralling – and harrowing – account of how the 1967 Summer of Love gave way to 20 or so winters of discontent" (Washington Post).

References

External links
David Talbot Website 

2012 non-fiction books
Books about the San Francisco Bay Area
Books with missing cover
Free Press (publisher) books
History books about the United States
History of San Francisco